Puttelange may refer to:

France
 Puttelange-aux-Lacs, a commune in the Moselle department
 Puttelange-lès-Thionville, a commune in the Moselle department

Germany
 Puttelange-lès-Sarrelouis, French exonym for a town in Saarland